Emily Meade (born January 10, 1989) is an American film and television actress. She has appeared in films such as Twelve (2010), My Soul to Take (2010), Gimme Shelter (2013), That Awkward Moment (2014), Money Monster (2016), and Nerve (2016), and the television series Boardwalk Empire, Law & Order: Special Victims Unit, The Leftovers and Broad City. She also portrayed a future version of the character Ella Blake in the third season finale of Fringe, and had a leading role in the HBO series The Deuce (2017–2019).

Life and career
In 1997, at the age of seven, she sang "Up, over, through and under" (Sottosopra) at the Italian song contest Zecchino d'Oro. The song won the Zecchino d'Argento prize for the best non-Italian song.

She then starred in My Soul to Take, directed by Wes Craven. Co-stars included Max Thieriot and Nick Lashaway. She starred in the 2010 release, Twelve as a teenage drug addict. Meade appeared in the independent drama, Bluebird, in 2013. She had a supporting role in the first season of the HBO drama, The Leftovers. In 2016, she portrayed Sydney in the film Nerve starring Dave Franco and Emma Roberts. She received considerable critical acclaim for her portrayal of prostitute and porn star Lori Madison in HBO's The Deuce, creator David Simon describing her performance as "one of the best I ever got on a show".

After the 2017 Weinstein scandal and the Me Too movement highlighted the often routine nature of sexual harassment and misconduct in the industry, Meade was one of the first performers to demand professional safeguards for their well-being on set, leading to the presence of an intimacy coordinator on film and television series. Noting the power-structure in a production, performers (particularly young, inexperienced ones) might otherwise not feel able to speak up if directors, staff members or other actors disregarded their consent or previous agreements regarding intimate scenes.

Filmography

Film

Television

References

External links 

1989 births
Living people
21st-century American actresses
American film actresses
American television actresses
Actresses from New York City
Place of birth missing (living people)
Zecchino d'Oro singers